Riyadh Gallery Mall, or simply Riyadh Gallery, is an indoor shopping center and a commercial complex located at an intersection between King Fahad Road and Olaya Street in Riyadh, Saudi Arabia. Spanned across 154,740 sq. meters, it was inaugurated in 2007 and was owned by the late businessman Sheikh Saleh al-Rajhi. It is among the most popular malls in the country's capital and includes several retail outlets, hypermarkets and department stores. The mall was auctioned in 2019.

History 
In late July 2006, Al Jazirah newspaper reported that the Riyadh Gallery Mall has neared eighty percent of its completion, and the Sheikh Saleh Bin Abdul Aziz Al Rajhi Business Council has decided to launch the shopping complex on August 28, 2007 (15 Sha'ban 1428).

Design 
The complex has 4 floors and 170 stores in total. It has 7 gates for entrance and exit.

References 

Shopping malls in Saudi Arabia